Tania Yáñez Martínez (born 8 March 1986) is a former Spanish female handballer. The 2013–2014 season was the top scorer in the Spanish League.

Achievements 
División de Honor Femenina:
Winner: 2015/2016
Spanish Queen's Cup:
Winner: 2016

References 

Living people
1986 births
Spanish female handball players
Sportspeople from Barakaldo
Handball players from the Basque Country (autonomous community)